Malik Mukhtar Ahmad Bharath is a Pakistani politician who has been a member of the National Assembly of Pakistan since August 2018. Previously he was a Member of the Provincial Assembly of the Punjab, from 2002 to May 2018.

Early life and education
He was born on 29 September 1976 in Lahore.

He has the degree of Bachelor of Medicine and Bachelor of Surgery which he received in 2001 from Quaid-e-Azam Medical College.

Political career
He was elected to the Provincial Assembly of the Punjab as a candidate of Pakistan Muslim League (N) (PML-N) from Constituency PP-28 (Sargodha-I) in 2002 Pakistani general election. He received 32,480 votes and defeated Haroon Ehsan Paracha, a candidate of Pakistan Peoples Party (PPP).

He was re-elected to the Provincial Assembly of the Punjab as a candidate of Pakistan Muslim League (Q) (PML-Q) from Constituency PP-28 (Sargodha-I) in 2008 Pakistani general election. He received 45,686 votes and defeated Haji Mushtaq Ahmed Gondal, a candidate of PPP.

He was re-elected to the Provincial Assembly of the Punjab as a candidate of PML-N from Constituency PP-28 (Sargodha-I) in 2013 Pakistani general election. He received 58,531 votes and defeated Hassan Inam Piracha, a candidate of Pakistan Tehreek-e-Insaf (PTI). In June 2017, he was inducted into the provincial Punjab cabinet of Chief Minister Shehbaz Sharif and was made Provincial Minister of Punjab for Population Welfare.

He was elected to the National Assembly of Pakistan as a candidate of PML-N from Constituency NA-88 (Sargodha-I) in 2018 Pakistani general election.

References

Living people
Punjab MPAs 2013–2018
1976 births
Pakistan Muslim League (N) MPAs (Punjab)
Punjab MPAs 2008–2013
Punjab MPAs 2002–2007
Pakistani MNAs 2018–2023